Far'un is a Palestinian town in the Tulkarm Governorate in the northwestern West Bank, located four kilometers south of Tulkarm near the border with Israel. According to the Palestinian Central Bureau of Statistics, Far'un had a population of 3,100 inhabitants in 2007 but raised to 4,321 inhabitants in 2020.

History
In 1265, Far'un was among the villages and estates sultan Baibars allocated to his amirs after he had expelled the Crusaders. Half of the income from Far'un went to his emir Saif al-Din Dakhak al-Baghdadi, the other half to his emir Alam al-Din Sanjar al-Azkashi.

In 1320, Far'un is shown by Marino Sanuto on his map from that year as Farona.

Ottoman era
Far'un  was incorporated into the Ottoman Empire in 1517 with all of  Palestine, and in 1596 it appeared  in the tax registers as being in the Nahiya of Bani Sa'b of the Liwa of Nablus.  It had a population of 23 households, all Muslims. The villagers paid a fixed tax rate of 33,3% on various agricultural products, such as  wheat, barley, fruit trees, goats and/or beehives,  in addition to "occasional revenues"; a total of  3,837  akçe. 9/24 of the revenues went to a waqf.

Far'un was marked as a village named  "Faroun" on Pierre Jacotin's map surveyed during Napoleon's 1799 invasion. In 1838, Fer'on was noted as a Greek Christian village in the Beni Sa'ab area, west of Nablus.

In 1870,  the French explorer Victor Guérin noted that it was situated on a hill, and contained 500 inhabitants. In 1882,  the PEF's Survey of Palestine (SWP) described it as "a small village on a slope, at the edge of the plain, with a few trees and a well to the east. The inhabitants are Greek Christians. [..] The name means "Pharaoh" but may perhaps be a corruption of Pharathoni or Pirathion."

British Mandate era
In the 1922 census of Palestine conducted by the British Mandate authorities, Far'un had a population of 341, all Muslims,  increasing by the 1931 census to 456, 450 Muslims and 6 Christians, in 107 houses.

In  the 1945 statistics  the population of Far'un  was 710, 700 Muslims and 10 Christians,  and the land area was  8,851  dunams,  according to an official land and population survey. 390 dunams were plantations and irrigable land, 6,479 used for cereals, while 24 dunams were built-up (urban) land.

Jordanian era
After the 1948 Arab–Israeli War and the 1949 Armistice Agreements, Far'un  came under Jordanian rule.

In 1961, the population was  1,093.

Post-1967

During the Six-Day War in 1967, Far'un came under Israeli occupation and has remained so since. The total land area of the town 8,800 dunams, however nearly half of Far'un's land has been confiscated by Israeli authorities. It currently has a land area of 4,333 dunams of which 495 is built-up area. About 70% of the town's land is planted with olive groves, 5% is cultivated with citrus, guava and almond trees.

Most of the town's labor force is employed in agriculture or work inside Israel. Far'un is governed by a Village Council and contains a mosque, two schools, a medical clinic and a child care center.

Nufs Jebil

1.5 km SE of Far'un village centre lies  Nufs Jebil. Nisf Jubeil was a Crusader casale named Seingebis belonging to the territory of Caesarea in the early 13th-century.  In 1207 Lady Juliana of Caesarea granted Seingebis along with  nearby Far'un to the Knights Hospitallers.
In 1882, SWP found "Foundations on a hill" here.

References

Bibliography

External links
Welcome To Far'un
Survey of Western Palestine, Map 11:    IAA, Wikimedia commons
Jacotin, map #45

Tulkarm Governorate
Villages in the West Bank
Municipalities of the State of Palestine